In June 2018, France played a three-test series against  as part of the 2018 mid-year rugby union tests. The series was part of the sixth year of the global rugby calendar established by World Rugby, which runs through to 2019.

Fixtures

Squads
Note: Ages, caps and clubs are as per 9 June, the first test match of the tour.

France
On 22 May, Brunel named a 32-man squad ahead of France's three-test series against New Zealand.

On 27 May, Sébastien Taofifenua was called up to the squad to replace the injured Eddy Ben Arous.

On 10 June, Rémy Grosso was declared forfait for the rest of the tour.

Coaching team:
 Head coach:  Jacques Brunel
 Backs coach:  Jean-Baptiste Élissalde
 Forwards coach:  Sébastien Bruno
 Defence coach:  Julien Bonnaire

New Zealand
On 20 May, Hansen named a 33-man squad ahead of the All Blacks' three-test June Series against France (9 June, 16 June, and 23 June).

Liam Coltman and Akira Ioane were included in the squad as precautionary injury cover.

On 1 June, Sonny Bill Williams was ruled out of the series due to a knee injury.

On 4 June, Tom Franklin, Luke Romano and Matt Todd were called up as injury cover, with Romano covering for Brodie Retallick who was ruled out of the first test.

All squad members play rugby in New Zealand.

Coaching team:
 Head coach:  Steve Hansen
 Attack coach:  Ian Foster
 Forwards coach:  Mike Cron
 Defence coach:  Scott McLeod

Matches

First test

Notes:
 Karl Tu'inukuafe (New Zealand) made his international debut.
 Beauden Barrett, Jordie Barrett and Scott Barrett became the first trio of brother to start in an All Blacks XV.

Second test

Notes:
 Pierre Bougarit (France) made his international debut.
 New Zealand retain the Dave Gallaher Trophy.

Third test

Notes:
 Shannon Frizell, Jack Goodhue, Jackson Hemopo and Richie Mo'unga (all New Zealand) and Félix Lambey (France) made their international debuts.

See also
 2018 mid-year rugby union internationals

References

External links
 Official Website of New Zealand Rugby
 Official Website of French Rugby

2018
2018
2017–18 in French rugby union
2018 rugby union tours
2018 in New Zealand rugby union
June 2018 sports events in New Zealand